Frank Wiegand (born 15 March 1943) is a German former swimmer, Olympic medalist and world record holder. He participated in the 1960, 1964 and  1968 Summer Olympics, winning a total of four silver medals.

He won eight medals at two European championships, in 1962 and 1966, including four gold medals in freestyle and medley events. In 1966, he also set a new world record in the 400 metres freestyle and was chosen East German German Sportspersonality of the Year.

Wiegand studied sports science aiming to become a coach, but was redirected to a labour union instead. After the reunification of Germany he worked as a real estate manager at Zeuthen near Berlin.

References

1943 births
Living people
Sportspeople from Saxony
East German male swimmers
German male swimmers
German male freestyle swimmers
Olympic swimmers of the United Team of Germany
Olympic swimmers of East Germany
Olympic silver medalists for the United Team of Germany
Olympic silver medalists for East Germany
Medalists at the 1964 Summer Olympics
Medalists at the 1968 Summer Olympics
Swimmers at the 1960 Summer Olympics
Swimmers at the 1964 Summer Olympics
Swimmers at the 1968 Summer Olympics
World record setters in swimming
European Aquatics Championships medalists in swimming
Olympic silver medalists in swimming
People from Annaberg-Buchholz
21st-century German people
20th-century German people